"Timber, I'm Falling in Love" is a song written by Kostas, and recorded by American country music artist Patty Loveless.  It was released in May 1989 as the third single from her album Honky Tonk Angel.

Background
"Timber, I'm Falling in Love" was Loveless' first No. 1 record on Billboard's Hot Country Singles chart. The song charted for 18 weeks on the Billboard Hot Country Singles and Tracks chart, reaching the top of the chart during the week of August 12, 1989.

The song appears in the movie A Few Good Men in the seafood restaurant scene. 

This song was covered on the fourth season of The Voice by winner Danielle Bradbery in a duet with her coach, Blake Shelton.

Charts

Weekly charts

Year-end charts

Sources

1989 singles
Patty Loveless songs
Songs written by Kostas (songwriter)
Song recordings produced by Tony Brown (record producer)
MCA Records singles
1988 songs